Darrin Phillip Gayles (born December 16, 1966) is a United States district judge of the United States District Court for the Southern District of Florida and former Florida Circuit Court judge.

Education and legal career 

Gayles received a Bachelor of Arts degree in 1990 from Howard University. He received a Juris Doctor in 1993 from the George Washington University Law School. He began his career as an assistant state attorney in the Miami-Dade State Attorney's Office from 1993 to 1997. From 1997 to 1999, he served as an assistant district counsel at the United States Immigration and Naturalization Service. From 1999 to 2004, he served as an assistant United States attorney for the Southern District of Florida.

Judicial career

State judicial service 
In 2004, Gayles became a judge, serving as a county judge in Miami-Dade County within the Eleventh Judicial Circuit. From 2011 to 2014, he served as a Circuit Court Judge on the Eleventh Judicial Circuit Court of Florida.

Federal judicial service 

On February 6, 2014, President Barack Obama nominated Gayles to serve as a United States District Judge of the United States District Court for the Southern District of Florida, to the seat vacated by Judge Patricia A. Seitz, who assumed senior status on November 16, 2012. He received a hearing before the United States Senate Judiciary Committee on April 1, 2014. On May 8, 2014, his nomination was reported out of committee by a voice vote. On June 16, 2014, the United States Senate invoked cloture by a 55–37 vote. On June 17, 2014, his nomination was confirmed by a 98–0 vote, making him the first openly gay African-American federal judge. He received his judicial commission on June 19, 2014.

Cases

Sitting with the 11th circuit in July 2020, Gayles dissented when the court upheld an Alabama voter ID law without a trial even though evidence showed that voters of color were twice as likely to lack ID as white voters. Gayles wrote "The majority opinion essentially argues that we should not penalize Alabama’s legislators for Alabama’s past; rather, we should start with a clean slate when reviewing the Photo ID Law. But this is not what the law commands us to do. Alabama’s history of voter suppression is relevant here and provides a wealth of direct and circumstantial evidence that should be considered at trial."

Personal

Gayles is openly gay.

See also 
 List of African-American federal judges
 List of African-American jurists
 List of first minority male lawyers and judges in the United States
 List of first minority male lawyers and judges in Florida
 List of LGBT jurists in the United States

References

External links
 
 

1966 births
Living people
21st-century American judges
African-American judges
American gay men
Assistant United States Attorneys
Florida lawyers
Florida state court judges
George Washington University Law School alumni
Howard University alumni
Judges of the United States District Court for the Southern District of Florida
LGBT African Americans
LGBT appointed officials in the United States
LGBT people from Florida
LGBT judges
LGBT lawyers
People from Miami Shores, Florida
State attorneys
United States district court judges appointed by Barack Obama